The Hong Kong Football Association Chairman's Cup was established by HKFA in 1975. It is now a competition for the reserve teams of Hong Kong First Division clubs.

Past winners

 
H
Football cup competitions in Hong Kong